Still Not Black Enough is the sixth studio album by American heavy metal band W.A.S.P., first released in June 1995 in Japan and the UK. It was not released in the U.S. until August 1996 through Castle Records.
 
Still Not Black Enough was originally slated for release as a Blackie Lawless solo album, but due to the heavy content, Lawless changed his mind and decided to release it as a W.A.S.P. album.  This had also been the case for the previous album, The Crimson Idol.  Still Not Black Enough is considered somewhat a successor to The Crimson Idol, bearing a strong resemblance with its lyrical themes.  However, instead of telling the story of the fictional character Jonathan, this album is mostly a collection of personal songs from Blackie Lawless, including issues involving the death of his mother and personal crises just after the world tour for The Crimson Idol.

Track listings
All songs written by Blackie Lawless, unless otherwise indicated.

 The European and 2001 remastered versions have the same track listing, without the Queen cover.

 The American version has the same track listing without "Breathe", but with bonus tracks "Skinwalker", "One Tribe", and "Whole Lotta Rosie". Additionally, there was a 15-track pirated version containing all of the above tracks, plus "Breathe" and a cover of AC/DC's "It's a Long Way to the Top (If You Wanna Rock 'n' Roll)".  These last 2 tracks could also be found on some singles.

Personnel
Musicians
Blackie Lawless – vocals, lead and rhythm guitars, acoustic guitar, keyboards, bass, electric sitar, producer
 Bob Kulick - lead guitar
John Shadowinds – lead guitar (guest appearance)
Frankie Banali – drums
Mark Josephson – electric violin
Stet Howland – additional percussion (on "Scared to Death" and "One Tribe")
Tracey Whitney, K.C. Calloway – background vocals

Production 
Mikey Davis – engineer, mixing
Chris Ashem, Mark Humphries – assistant engineers
Andy Van Dette – mastering at Masterdisk, New York
Kosh – album design

Charts

Album

Singles

References

W.A.S.P. albums
1995 albums
Albums produced by Blackie Lawless
Castle Communications albums